The 29th Legislative Assembly of British Columbia sat from 1970 to 1972. The members were elected in the British Columbia general election held in August 1969. The Social Credit Party led by W. A. C. Bennett formed the government. The New Democratic Party (NDP) led by Dave Barrett formed the official opposition.

William Harvey Murray served as speaker for the assembly.

Members of the 29th General Assembly 
The following members were elected to the assembly in 1969:

Notes:

Party standings

By-elections 
None

Other changes 
George Scott Wallace becomes an Independent on August 17, 1971. He joins the Progressive Conservatives in January 1972.
Donald Albert Marshall joins the Progressive Conservatives on March 22, 1972.

References 

Political history of British Columbia
Terms of British Columbia Parliaments
1970 establishments in British Columbia
1972 disestablishments in British Columbia
20th century in British Columbia